The 2021 Geneva Open (sponsored by Gonet) was a men's tennis tournament played on outdoor clay courts. It was the 18th edition of the Geneva Open and part of the ATP Tour 250 series of the 2021 ATP Tour. It took place at the Tennis Club de Genève in Geneva, Switzerland, from May 15 through May 22, 2021.

Champions

Singles

  Casper Ruud def.  Denis Shapovalov, 7–6(8–6), 6–4

Doubles

  John Peers /  Michael Venus def.  Simone Bolelli /  Máximo González, 6–2, 7–5

Points and prize money

Point distribution

Prize money 

*per team

Singles main draw entrants

Seeds 

 Rankings are as of May 10, 2021.

Other entrants 
The following players received wildcards into the singles main draw:
  Grigor Dimitrov
  Arthur Cazaux
  Dominic Stricker

The following players received entry from the qualifying draw:
  Marco Cecchinato
  Pablo Cuevas
  Ilya Ivashka
  Henri Laaksonen

The following player received entry as a lucky loser:
  Daniel Altmaier

Withdrawals 
Before the tournament
  Alexander Bublik → replaced by  Tennys Sandgren
  Borna Ćorić → replaced by  Feliciano López
  Alejandro Davidovich Fokina → replaced by  Thiago Monteiro
  Alex de Minaur → replaced by  Jordan Thompson
  Cristian Garín → replaced by  Daniel Altmaier
  Filip Krajinović → replaced by  Salvatore Caruso
  Jan-Lennard Struff → replaced by  Fernando Verdasco

Retirements
  Stefano Travaglia

Doubles main draw entrants

Seeds

 Rankings are as of May 10, 2021.

Other entrants
The following pairs received wildcards into the doubles main draw:
  Arthur Cazaux /  Li Hanwen
  Marc-Andrea Hüsler /  Dominic Stricker

Withdrawals 
Before the tournament
  Alex de Minaur /  Jordan Thompson → replaced by  Nathaniel Lammons /  Jackson Withrow
  Wesley Koolhof /  Jean-Julien Rojer → replaced by  Marin Čilić /  Andrey Golubev
  Nicholas Monroe /  Reilly Opelka → replaced by  Nicholas Monroe /  Benoît Paire
  Rajeev Ram /  Joe Salisbury → replaced by  Pablo Cuevas /  Guido Pella

References

External links 
 Official website

 
2021 ATP Tour
2021
2021 in Swiss tennis
May 2021 sports events in Switzerland